Callophrys dumetorum, the coastal green hairstreak, bramble green hairstreak, or bluish green hairstreak, is a butterfly of the family Lycaenidae. It is found in the United States in coastal California and rarely in inland California. Subspecies C. d. oregonensis is known as the Oregon green hairstreak.

The wingspan is 25–32 mm. Adults are on wing from March to May in one generation.

Larvae have been recorded on Lotus scoparius, Eriogonum fasciculatum, Eriogonum latifolium, and Eriogonum nudum. Adults feed on flower nectar from host plants. They also feed on buckwheats and desert parsley. Its habitats include open sites and clearings in Douglas-fir and ponderosa pine forests, road-cuts, and coastal dunes.

Subspecies 
Callophrys dumetorum dumetorum
Callophrys dumetorum oregonensis Gorelick, [1970] (Washington, Oregon)

References

External links
Butterflies and Moths of North America
UC Davis Butterfly Site
Green Hairstreak Project, San Francisco

Callophrys
Butterflies of North America
Butterflies described in 1852
Taxa named by Jean Baptiste Boisduval